is a city located in Osaka Prefecture, Japan. , the city had an estimated population of 184,615 in 80862 households and a population density of 2200 persons per km².

Geography
Izumi s located in the southwestern part of Osaka Prefecture, about 25 km from the city center of Osaka and about 20 km from Kansai International Airport, forming a long and narrow city area (6.9 km east–west, 18.8 km north–south) from north to south. The total area of the city is the fifth largest in Osaka Prefecture after  Takatsuki. The terrain is low from the southeast to the northwest, with the Izumi Mountains in the south, hills in the center and north, and flat land in the northwest. The city ranges in elevation from 9.2 meters to 885.7 meters above sea level ). Parts of the city are within the borders of the Kongō-Ikoma-Kisen Quasi-National Park.

Neighboring municipalities
Osaka Prefecture
Sakai
Kishiwada
Kawachinagano
Takaishi
 Izumiōtsu
Tadaoka
Wakayama Prefecture
 Katsuragi

Climate
Izumi has a Humid subtropical climate (Köppen Cfa) characterized by warm summers and cool winters with light to no snowfall.  The average annual temperature in Izumi is 14.0 °C. The average annual rainfall is 1475 mm with September as the wettest month. The temperatures are highest on average in August, at around 25.9 °C, and lowest in January, at around 2.6 °C.

Demographics
Per Japanese census data, the population of Izumi has risen steadily over the past century.

History
The area of the modern city of Izumi was within ancient Izumi Province, and was the site of the provincial capital and kokubun-ji of the province.  In the Edo Period, a small portion of the area was controlled by Hakata Domain. The villages of Kokufu, Gosho and Hakata were established within Izumi District with the creation of the modern municipalities system on April 1, 1889.  On April 1, 1896 the area became part of Senboku District, Osaka. The town of Izumi was created on April 1, 1933 by the merger of Kokufu,Gosho and Hakata. On September 1, 1956 Izumi merged with the villages of Kita-Ikeda, Minami-Ikeda, Minami-Matsuo, Yokoyama, and Minami-Yokoyama to form the city of Izumi.

Government
Izumi has a mayor-council form of government with a directly elected mayor and a unicameral city council of 24 members. Izumi contributes two members to the Osaka Prefectural Assembly. In terms of national politics, the city is part of Osaka 18th district of the lower house of the Diet of Japan.

Economy
Izumi has a mixed economy light manufacturing and agriculture. Major industries include cotton products, glass crafts, artificial pearls, processed metal products and various electronic devices. With the opening of the Semboku Rapid Railway  in 1995, the city established the  "Techno Stage Izumi" industrial park, which has attracted over 100 companies.

Education
Izumi has 20 public elementary schools and nine public middle schools operated by the city government and three public high school operated by the Osaka Prefectural Department of Education. The prefecture also operates one special education school for the handicapped.  A private college,  Momoyama Gakuin University,  is located in Izumi.

Transportation

Railway
 JR West – Hanwa Line
  -  - 
 Semboku Rapid Railway

Highway
  Hanwa Expressway
  Sakai Senboku Road

Local attractions
Ikegami-Sone Site
Izumikoganezuka Kofun
Kubosō Memorial Museum of Arts, Izumi
Osaka Prefectural Museum of Yayoi Culture

Sister city relations
 -  Bloomington, Minnesota, USA

Notable people from Izumi
Masayuki Kuwahara, professional baseball player
Hiroto Kyoguchi, professional boxer
Kanako Nishi, writer, novelist, essayist and artist (born in Tehran, Iran but raised in Izumi, Osaka, her family's hometown)
Taizo Sugitani, equestrian and Olympic show jumping rider
Super Delfin, professional wrestler
Jun Akiyama, professional wrestler
Taisuke Okuno, professional mixed martial artist
Mitsuo Tateishi, position player coach for the Chunichi Dragons in Japan's Nippon Professional Baseball

References

External links

 

 
Cities in Osaka Prefecture